Félix Gatineau (November 12, 1857 – December 21, 1927) was a French-Canadian statesman and historian in his adopted hometown of Southbridge, Massachusetts. He was born in Sainte-Victoire-de-Sorel, Quebec, an area halfway between Montreal and Quebec City.  Gatineau arrived in Southbridge in 1877.  Among his many deeds, he was a state representative in Massachusetts in 1906, 1920–21, and 1927, and led several French-Canadian societies. His written works include L'Histoire des Franco-Américains de Southbridge and L'Historique des Conventions Générales des Canadiens-Français aux Etats-Unis.

A statue was erected in his honor and dedicated on September 1, 1927, at a fork in a main road in Southbridge by the Union Saint-Jean-Baptiste d’Amérique, as he was one of the society's founders.  The Gatineau bust is a local landmark, and often serves as a wayfinder, with locals directing people "Félix to the left" or "Félix to the right."

See also
 1921–1922 Massachusetts legislature
 1927–1928 Massachusetts legislature

References

1857 births
1927 deaths
People from Sorel-Tracy
People from Southbridge, Massachusetts
French Quebecers
Members of the Massachusetts House of Representatives